Gosh or GOSH may refer to:

People

Surnamed
 Efrat Gosh (born 1983), Israeli singer-songwriter
 Mkhitar Gosh, Armenian scholar and priest
 Salah Gosh, National Security Advisor for Sudan

Given named, nicknamed
 Lord Gosh, British rapper
 Gosh Dilay (born 1985), Filipino musician

Fictional characters
 Rogan Gosh (comics), a comic book character

Places
 Gosh, Armenia, a town in Tavush Province of Armenia
 Monastery of Gosh, Gosh, Armenia
 Great Ormond Street Hospital, a children's hospital in London, England

Fictional places
Gosh, a fictional kingdom described in the book The Glugs of Gosh, written by C. J. Dennis

Other uses
 Gosh Enterprises, a U.S. food services company
 GOSH! Magazine, a 1978-79 Los Angeles magazine
 Gosh (Jamie xx song), a 2015 song by Jamie xx from In Colour
 Mkhitar Gosh Medal of Armenia for public service
 A minced oath for god

See also

 
 Gosh darn
 Ghosh, an Indian surname
 Gôh, Cote d'Ivoire
 God (disambiguation)
 OMG (disambiguation)
 Oh my gosh (disambiguation)